Natural High is the sixth studio album by the musical group the Commodores, released in 1978. "Three Times a Lady", released as a single, became their first Billboard Hot 100 number one. The album topped Billboard's R&B Album charts for 8 non-consecutive weeks and peaked at number three on the Billboard 200.

Critical reception

Natural High earned the group a 1979 Grammy nomination for Best R&B Performance by a Duo, Group or Chorus.

Record World called the single "Flying High" a "classically slick r&b hip swinger with cross format appeal."

Track listing
Motown – M7-902R1

Personnel

Commodores 
 Lionel Richie – vocals, saxophones, keyboards
 Milan Williams – keyboards
 Thomas McClary – vocals, guitars
 Ronald LaPread – bass
 Walter Orange – vocals, drums, percussion
 William King – trumpet

Additional musicians 
 Cal Harris – synthesizer programming 
 James Anthony Carmichael – horn and string arrangements 

The Mean Machine
 Eddie "Bongo" Brown
 David Cochrane
 Harold Hudson 
 Winston Sims

Production 
 Commodores – producers, arrangerments 
 James Anthony Carmichael – producer, arrangerments
 Cal Harris – engineer, mixing 
 Jane Clark – engineer 
 Norm Ung – art direction, design 
 David McMacken  illustration 
 Jim Shea – photography 
 Suzee Ikeda – project manager 
 Benjamin Ashburn – management

Charts

Album

Singles

Certifications

See also
List of number-one R&B albums of 1978 (U.S.)

References

External links
 The Commodores-Natural High at Discogs

1978 albums
Commodores albums
Motown albums
Albums produced by James Anthony Carmichael
Albums produced by Lionel Richie